Moranlı (also, Moranly and Muranly) is a village and municipality in the Sabirabad Rayon of Azerbaijan.  It has a population of 3,780.

References 

Populated places in Sabirabad District